Grappenhall and Thelwall is a civil parish in the Borough of Warrington and the ceremonial county of Cheshire, England, and includes the villages of Grappenhall and Thelwall. The Bridgewater Canal and the A56 road pass through Grappenhall and to the south of Thelwall in an east–west direction, and the A50 road runs in a north–south direction between them. Within the parish are 30 buildings that are recorded in the National Heritage List for England as designated listed buildings.  Of these, one is listed at Grade I, the highest of the three grades, and the other 28 at Grade II, the lowest grade. The Grade I listed building is a church dating back to the 12th century. The Grade II listed buildings comprise a variety of structures, including another church, houses, aqueducts, bridges, a public house, farm buildings, stocks, a sundial, a milepost, a mounting block, a war memorial, and a telephone kiosk.

Key

Listed buildings

See also
Listed buildings in Appleton
Listed buildings in High Legh
Listed buildings in Lymm
Listed buildings in Stockton Heath
Listed buildings in Stretton
Listed buildings in Warrington (unparished area)
Listed buildings in Woolston

References
Citations

Sources

Listed buildings in Warrington
Lists of listed buildings in Cheshire